Mohammad Beyzaeinejad (born 21 November 1988) is an Iranian professional futsal player. He is currently a member of Gohar Zamin in the Iranian Futsal Super League.

Honours

Club 
 Iran Futsal's 1st Division
 Champion (1): 2015–16 (Labaniyat Arjan)

References 

1988 births
Living people
People from Shiraz
Sportspeople from Fars province
Iranian men's futsal players
Futsal forwards
Arjan Shiraz FSC players
Tasisat Daryaei FSC players
Shahrdari Saveh FSC players
Ana Sanat FC players
Farsh Ara FSC players
Iranian expatriate futsal players
Iranian expatriate sportspeople in Azerbaijan